heute-journal (roughly Today's Journal) is a television news magazine broadcast on ZDF, a national German television network.

History  
The programme premiered on 2 January 1978 as a late weekday evening 20 minute program. Originally, it was broadcast at 9 p.m. Monday through Thursday and at 10 p.m. on Fridays. It has been broadcast at 9:45 p.m. since 1 January 1984.  In 1991, the running time of the programme was extended to 30 minutes.  15-minute editions were added on Saturdays (in 1992) and Sundays (in 2000). The running time of the programme is sometimes extended to one hour, to cover special events or particularly important stories. During football matches, a short edition of heute-journal is generally broadcast during the half-time break, eliminating the second news summary, stock market report and the final report (usually related to science or culture).

The programme usually starts at 9:45pm and runs for 27 minutes, followed by a 3-minute weather forecast. On Fridays it starts at 10:00pm, after the Friday crime drama; on Saturdays it is usually broadcast from 10:45pm.

Concept 
In contrast to Heute, its early evening counterpart,  heute-journal provides in-depth coverage of the news, usually with detailed background information and interviews with politicians, business leaders, experts, and other key people.  There is also a daily report from the Frankfurt Stock Exchange and a weather forecast.  Wolf von Lojewski, a former presenter and managing editor of the programme, once said that while heute will report that a particular politician has resigned, heute-journal will also provide detailed analysis on the reasons for the resignation.

Each edition of heute-journal has two presenters: the main presenter, who introduces most reports and conducts interviews, and the co-presenter, who is part of the editorial team and presents news summaries during the programme. The presenters generally alternate weekly.

The programme is comparable to  Tagesthemen broadcast on Das Erste.  The programmes' audience is sometimes higher than that of heute.

Opening sequence 
Initially, the program programme's opening sequence showed the anchors, with a clock overlay and a ticker with headlines of the day. The ticker sound effect was Morse code for "heute".

The programme moved to a new, virtual studio in 2009, and a new opening sequence was added at the same time.  The camera panned towards the anchors while the day's headlines, along with the time, were seen in the background; there was no real title sequence.

As of 19 February 2011, a darker background is used than for other heute news programmes. Instead of a 2D world map in the background, five globes are shown. At the start of the sequence, the clock and headlines appear in the foreground, followed by a title sequence, and finally either a zoom to the presenters or a cut to footage of the main story.

As of 25 June 2007, the program is broadcast in 16:9.  It is available as a video or audio podcast.

Presenters

Current presenters

Former presenters

Co-presenters 
Since 30 June 1986, there has been a co-presenter, or an "editor in the studio", who presents a news summary during the programme.

Former co-presenters

References

External links 
  (in German)

ZDF original programming
German television news shows
1978 German television series debuts
1980s German television series
1990s German television series
2000s German television series
2010s German television series
German-language television shows